Corrandulla is a small village and census town in County Galway, Ireland. It is located in the civil parish of Annaghdown. Corrandulla was designated as a census town by the Central Statistics Office for the first time in the 2016 census, at which time it had a population of 241 people.

The church in the village, Saint Brendan's Catholic Church, was built in 1831 and is in Annaghdown/Corrandulla parish of the Roman Catholic Archdiocese of Tuam. Corrandulla National School, also known as Scoil Bhrige agus Bhreandain Naofa, had an enrollment of 271 pupils as of the 2020 school year.

An annual agricultural show, the Corrandulla Show, has been run in Corrandulla since 1977; The 2020 event was cancelled as part of the response to the COVID-19 pandemic in Ireland.

See also
 Cregg Mill, County Galway

References

Towns and villages in County Galway